The Castagna Imperial Landaulet is a four-wheel drive luxury sports coupe by the Carrozzeria Castagna design firm, now known for their MINI concepts and conversions and known in the past for the Isotta Fraschini.

The Castagna Imperial Landaulet was shown at the 2006 Geneva Motor Show and was inspired by a model invented by Castagna in the Thirties.

External links

Concept cars
Cars of Italy